Nikola Radojičić (born 19 January 1992) is a Serbian football defender who plays for FK TEK Sloga.

References

External links
 
 
 

1992 births
Living people
Sportspeople from Valjevo
Association football defenders
Serbian footballers
FK Kolubara players
FK Mladost Lučani players
FK Metalac Gornji Milanovac players
Serbian expatriate footballers
Serbian expatriate sportspeople in Croatia
Expatriate footballers in Croatia
Croatian Football League players
NK Inter Zaprešić players
Serbian expatriate sportspeople in Slovakia
Expatriate footballers in Slovakia
FC Lokomotíva Košice players
FK Jedinstvo Ub players